Plicatula gibbosa, or the Atlantic kitten's paw, is a species of bivalve mollusc in the family Plicatulidae.

Description
The size of the shell attains 38.6 mm.

Distribution
It can be found along the Atlantic coast of North America, ranging from North Carolina to the West Indies.

References

 Jensen, R. H. (1997). A Checklist and Bibliography of the Marine Molluscs of Bermuda. Unp. , 547 pp
 Turgeon, D. D., W. G. Lyons, P. Mikkelsen, G. Rosenberg, and F. Moretzsohn. 2009. Bivalvia (Mollusca) of the Gulf of Mexico, Pp. 711–744 in Felder, D.L. and D.K. Camp (eds.), Gulf of Mexico–Origins, Waters, and Biota. Biodiversity. Texas A&M Press, Colleg
 Rosenberg, G. 1992. Encyclopedia of Seashells. Dorset: New York. 224 pp.
 Huber, M. (2010). Compendium of bivalves. A full-color guide to 3,300 of the world's marine bivalves. A status on Bivalvia after 250 years of research. Hackenheim: ConchBooks. 901 pp., 1 CD-ROM.

External links
 Lamarck, J. B. (1801). Système des animaux sans vertèbres, ou tableau général des classes, des ordres et des genres de ces animaux; Présentant leurs caractères essentiels et leur distribution, d'apres la considération de leurs rapports naturels et de leur organisation, et suivant l'arrangement établi dans les galeries du Muséum d'Histoire Naturelle, parmi leurs dépouilles conservées; Précédé du discours d'ouverture du Cours de Zoologie, donné dans le Muséum National d'Histoire Naturelle l'an 8 de la République. Published by the author and Deterville, Paris: viii + 432 pp
 Lamarck (J.-B. M.) de. (1819). Histoire naturelle des animaux sans vertèbres. Tome 6(1): vi + 343 pp. Paris: published by the author.

Plicatulidae
Bivalves described in 1801